Jarron is a given name. Notable people with the name include:

Jarron Collins (born 1978), American basketball coach and former player
Jarron Cumberland (born 1997), American basketball player
Jarron Gilbert (born 1986), American former football player

See also
Jaron, given name and surname
Jarren, given name